Black Virgin Mountain ( meaning "Black Lady Mountain") is a mountain in Tây Ninh City, Vietnam.  The mountain is the center of a Vietnamese myth about Bà Đen, a local deity of Khmer origin.  During the Vietnam War the area around the mountain was a hot zone as the Ho Chi Minh Trail ended a few kilometers west across the Cambodian border. As such there were many battles and American and Vietnamese soldiers based in the region remember the prominent landmark. After the war the mountain turned from a battleground to being famous for its beautiful temples and theme park.

Geography and fauna
At , the extinct volcano rises from the flat Mekong Delta jungle and farmland.  The mountain is almost a perfect cinder cone with a saddle and a slight bulge on her northwest side.  The mountain is honeycombed with caves and is covered in many large basalt boulders. The mountain is located approximately 10 km northeast of Tây Ninh and 96 km northwest of Ho Chi Minh City.

A species of gecko, Gekko badenii, is named for the mountain and is endemic to the mountain.

History

Pre-Vietnam War
Variations of the legend of Núi Bà Đen exist. The oldest Khmer myth involves a female deity, "Neang Khmau" who left her footprints on the mountain rocks. The Vietnamese myth centers around a woman, Bà Đen, falling in love with a soldier and then through betrayal or suicide Bà Đen dies on the mountain. It has special significance to the Vietnamese Buddhist population and has a famous shrine about two thirds of the way up the mountain. Also, to the Cao Dai sect the mountain has special religious significance and its temple, the Tay Ninh Holy See, is close to the mountain.

During World War II the mountain was occupied by the Japanese, and later it was controlled by the Viet Minh, the French and the Vietcong.

Vietnam War

The Mekong Delta is generally a flat region with the exception of the Black Virgin Mountain. The mountain commands everything in its sight and was therefore a strategic location for both sides during the war. In May 1964 the mountain top was assaulted by the Special Forces 3rd MIKE Force and the peak was held by American forces with the 121st Signal Battalion establishing a radio relay station, callsign Granite Romeo Tango, there in February 1966. Supplied by helicopter for much of the war the Americans controlled the top and the Vietcong controlled the bottom and surrounding foothills.

The base was occupied by over 140 Americans when on the night of 13 May 1968 the base was attacked and overrun by the Vietcong. By 02:30 on 14 May the Vietcong had been driven off by gunship and artillery fire. The results of the attack were 24 U.S. killed, 2 U.S. MIA and 25 Vietcong killed.

In January 1969 the mountain was extensively searched by 1st Brigade elements of the 3rd Battalion, 22nd Infantry, 4th Battalion, 23rd Infantry, and tanks from the 2nd Battalion, 34th Armor.  In the tunnels that honeycombed the mountain they found arms caches, and engaged Vietcong units stationed on the mountain. Throughout the war the Vietcong returned to the mountain and its cave bases.

Colonel Donald Cook was the first Marine captured in the Vietnam war. For a time he was held near Black Virgin mountain.

In early December 1974 heavy combat in Tây Ninh began, with PAVN rockets falling on the province capital and on adjacent military installations. The 80-man 3rd Company, 314th Regional Force Battalion guarding the radio relay station on the summit of Nui Ba Den began receiving attacks of increasing intensity and frequency. Helicopter resupply and evacuation had become impossible, and although the company commander reported sufficient food and ammunition, water was running very short and several severely wounded men required evacuation. PAVN assaults on Nui Ba Den continued throughout December 1974, but the RF Company held on. RVNAF efforts to resupply the troops on Nui Ba Den were largely unsuccessful. Helicopters were driven off by heavy fire, and fighter-bombers were forced to excessive altitudes by SA-7 missiles and antiaircraft artillery. One F-5A fighter-bomber was shot down by an SA-7 on 14 December. Finally on 6 January 1975, without food and water and with nearly all ammunition expended, the company picked up its wounded and withdrew down the mountain to friendly lines.

Tourist attraction

The mountain is famed for its beautiful views and temples.  Visitors may hike up trails, however the Núi Bà Đen gondola lift is an alternative route to the top of the temple complex. Many of the trails up the mountain are dangerous when wet.

Common fruit orchards on the mountain and in the neighborhood grow bananas, cashews, and the "custard apple", also called the "mountain custard apple" by the locals.

See also
Dong Ap Bia
25th Infantry Division - the US 25th was stationed near and on the mountain.

References

External links

 Video of May 1968 attack on the US base

Installations of the United States Army in South Vietnam
Mountains of Vietnam
Pleistocene volcanoes
Sacred mountains
Tourist attractions in Vietnam
Landforms of Tây Ninh province
Tourist attractions in Tây Ninh province